Viktorovka is a rural locality (a settlement) in Selektsionny Selsoviet Rural Settlement, Lgovsky District, Kursk Oblast, Russia. Population:

Geography 
The settlement is located 45.5 km from the Russia–Ukraine border, 70 km south-west of Kursk, 5 km south-west of the district center – the town Lgov, 1.5 km from the selsoviet center – Selektsionny.

 Climate
Viktorovka has a warm-summer humid continental climate (Dfb in the Köppen climate classification).

Transport 
Viktorovka is located on the road of regional importance  (Kursk – Lgov – Rylsk – border with Ukraine) as part of the European route E38, 1 km from the road of intermunicipal significance  (38K-017 – Fitizh), 0.5 km from the nearest railway station Artakowo (railway line 322 km – Lgov I).

The rural locality is situated 77.5 km from Kursk Vostochny Airport, 146 km from Belgorod International Airport and 280 km from Voronezh Peter the Great Airport.

References

Notes

Sources

Rural localities in Lgovsky District